Doron or Dorio, as it is said to be written in some manuscripts, is a city mentioned only by Pliny and located in Cilicia Tracheia, Some scholars have equated the city to Darieium or Dorieium in Phrygia mentioned by Stephanus of Byzantium.

References

Roman towns and cities in Turkey
Lost ancient cities and towns
Former populated places in Cilicia